Soera is an administrative ward in the Kondoa District of the Dodoma Region of Tanzania. It has four administrative villages Humai, Bukulu, Soera and Kwadinu  In 2016 the Tanzania National Bureau of Statistics report there were 8,277 people in the ward, from 7,616 in 2012.

Many of the Kondoa Rock-Art Sites, that are UNESCO World Heritage Sites, are located within the Soera Ward. The Fenga site is in the ward that include one of the most known paintings of people trying to capture large animals, including elephants.

References

Kondoa District
Wards of Dodoma Region